The Redland is an American hip hop and R&B duo that originated in Atlanta, Georgia. The group was formed in August 2005, when both its members Earvin Rodney (rhymes, vocals) and Robert Nkosi Evans (vocals) were still attending Morehouse College. Band members state that The Redland title symbolizes The Redlands of Louisiana and Oklahoma, where Earvin Rodney and Robert Nkosi Evans come from respectively. After founding The Redland, Earvin Rodney and Robert Nkosi Evans became better known by their stage names Earv Legend and Kose respectively.
 
With the debut of their single release, “So Far", featured on the NBA 2K11 soundtrack, NBA 2K11 officially introduced The Redland beyond the Morehouse College campus.

Beginnings
The Redland members both had individual passions for music. However, after meeting at Morehouse College in 2001, they discovered and cultivated their talents together as The Redland. Initially, the band was creating music for fun, but after building on-campus fan base and getting attention, they invested in professional studio equipment and decided to devote themselves to a musical career.

Career
In 2009, The Redland released their debut album EPIC that was made available for purchase on iTunes. The album featured singer Billie Miles. The album cover was shot by photographer and cinematographer Damien Marcano, and a video was shot for the single EPIC. The video aired on Fuse and VH1 Soul.

Following the success of EPIC, The Redland released free mixtape Dontknowwhatitmeans.com (Mixtape) in 2009. Djbooth.net sponsored and introduced the free album's lead single "Don’t Know What It Means". Mixtape tracks sample from such classic artists as Nirvana, Tupac, Led Zeppelin, Jay Z, Outkast, Jimi Hendrix, The Killers, Ice Cube, Lil Wayne, and Red Hot Chili Peppers. The mixtape was a Djbooth.net success receiving 4.6 out of 5 stars in member ratings.

In 2011, The Redland released Hip Hop Evolved on iTunes and the video for the album's lead single "Cool Out" appeared on YouTube. Featuring singer Bree D'Val and Grammy winner Bobby Avila as guitarist, the video showed the collaborators' crossing paths in Juarez, Mexico. The strangers go on to ride off  together after sharing a cool, tranquil performance. The video was shot in California's  Mojave Dessert.

The Redland's mixtape The Life. TheParty was released in late 2012 on the band's website. The Life. The Party's most popular song, "Bad Girls" (The Redland's take on Lana Del Rey's hit video "Games"), was featured in BeforetheBig Remix Battle against Kinetics and One Love. The Redland won the competition with 78% of all votes.

An Enlightened Contagion which is The Redland's first full studio album, was released in 2014 on iTunes. Album is written entirely by Earv and Kose, with every track produced by Kose. An Enlightened Contagion draws from the language of The Redland Manifesto, which is full of declarations about their goals and viewpoint. In 2015 The Redland released An Enlightened Contagion Deluxe which includes remixes and is a 16-track collection with messages on empowerment, survival, tolerance, consciousness and social justice.

Band members
 Earvin Rodney (rhymes, vocals), born October 20, 1983, is from New York City and grew up in Baton Rouge, Louisiana. 
 Robert Nkosi Evans (vocals), born March 10, 1983, is from Waco, Texas and grew up in Ardmore, Oklahoma.

Earv Legend stamps each song with rap lyrics. Kose serves The Redland not only as a rapper and singer, but he also produces each of their beats.

Kose described his counterpart Earv Legend in an interview for Adam’s World: “As an artist Earv Legend provides a vivid view of what he sees around him. He does this without judgment. He can find the poetry in any subject or person. I really don't look at him as just a rapper. To me he is more like an author who has just chosen music as his platform for now." 
The interview continues with Earv's apt description of Kose: “Kose is that once in a generation musician. He literally, out of everyone, is one of my favorite artists of all time. It's just a matter of time before the world hears what I’ve heard and comes to the same conclusion.”

Musical style and influences
The Redland has citied Tupac, John Legend, Bob Dylan and Common as their influencers. The band mixes various styles and genres from hip-hop, rap and R&B to pop and alternative to create a different sound.

Media and appearances
The Redland's most widespread success has been its song placement on Visual Concepts and 2K Sport's NBA 2K11 video game. The Redland's song, "So Far", was chosen to be featured on the game that went on to sell over 5.5 million units worldwide. "So Far"'s presence on YouTube encouraged covers, inspired tributes, and even fueled arguments over lyrics and meanings.

Over the years, The Redland has visited many radio stations for on-air interviews, including National Public Radio's Chocolate City; hosted by L.A.'s own Garth Trinidad. The band had video placement on On Demand. The Redland was selected for Virgin American In-Flight Airplay in the “New Music Discovered” category, and also for the Road to the Canadian Music Fest Tour 2010. The Redland's single Epic also made Rap Networks Record Breakers Top 30, marking number 17.

The band has performed across Atlanta at Stankonia, The Sweet Auburn Festival, The Masquerade, East Atlanta Lounge, MJQ's, and Smith's Olde Bar. While in L.A., they performed at The Roxy Theatre. On a trip to London in 2013, The Redland performed at popular night club Jalouse. In 2015 The Redland performed live at Midem, annual live music and networking festival and conference in Cannes, France.

According to The Redland website and social media posts, the band supports social justice and wants to use the power of music to influence issues such as Equality, World Hunger, Youth Development, Education, Voting, Political Activism, Women's Rights, Racial Incarceration Disparity and Gun Violence. The Redland has chosen the tagline "Where Music Meets Social Justice" to communicate their overall philosophy.

Discography

Albums

Songs

Music Videos

References

External links 
The Redland Official website 
The Redland Facebook page
The Redland Twitter

Alternative hip hop groups
American rhythm and blues musical groups
Musical groups established in 2005
Musical groups from Atlanta
Rappers from Atlanta
Southern hip hop groups
American musical duos
Hip hop duos
2005 establishments in Georgia (U.S. state)
African-American musical groups